Roman Stantien (born 16 October 1964) is a former Slovak professional ice hockey player, and later hockey coach. He played with HC Slovan Bratislava in the Slovak Extraliga.

He played also for HK Poprad, HC Dukla Trenčín, HC Vsetín, HC Vítkovice, Amur Khabarovsk and MsHK Žilina. He represented Slovakia at the 1998 Winter Olympics in Nagano. In 2009 he ended his active career.

Career statistics

Regular season and playoffs

International

References

External links

1964 births
Living people
Amur Khabarovsk players
HK Dukla Trenčín players
HK Poprad players
HC Slovan Bratislava players
HC Vítkovice players
Ice hockey players at the 1998 Winter Olympics
Motor České Budějovice players
MsHK Žilina players
Olympic ice hockey players of Slovakia
People from Kyjov
Slovak ice hockey centres
Slovak ice hockey coaches
VHK Vsetín players
Sportspeople from the South Moravian Region
Czechoslovak ice hockey centres
Slovak expatriate ice hockey players in Russia
Slovak expatriate ice hockey players in the Czech Republic